This is a list of law schools in Texas.

Notes

References

External links
U.S. News & World Report Ranking of Law Schools

 
Law schools
+Law schools
Texas
Law schools